Gary Powell (born 30 October 1979) is a rugby union player, currently with the Cardiff Blues.

Rugby
Powell joined Cardiff RFC in the summer of 1999 and had a successful season which included a call up to the Welsh Under 21 squad. Powell then moved to Richmond F.C., Leeds Tykes and Gloucester before returning to the Arms Park with Cardiff Blues in 2006.

In 2010, Powell had to retire due to a long-standing Achilles injury.

References

External links
Cardiff profile

1979 births
Living people
Cardiff Rugby players
Gloucester Rugby players
Leeds Tykes players
Richmond F.C. players
Rugby union players from Church Village
Welsh rugby union players
Rugby union props